Federal Route 232, or Jalan Pekan Sehari - Kampung Awah, is the federal road in Pahang, Malaysia. The Kilometre Zero of the Federal Route 232 starts at Jalan Temerloh-Maran junctions, at its interchange with the Federal Route 2, the main trunk road of the central of Peninsula Malaysia.

Features

At most sections, the Federal Route 232 was built under the JKR R5 road standard, allowing maximum speed limit of up to 90 km/h.

List of junctions and towns

References

232